Jacob Alexander Preston (March 12, 1796 – August 2, 1868) was a U.S. Representative from Maryland.

Born in Bel Air, Maryland, Preston attended the common schools. He graduated from the medical department of the University of Maryland at Baltimore in 1816, and practiced his profession in Harford, Baltimore, and Cecil counties. He also engaged in agricultural pursuits, and served with a Maryland regiment as lieutenant in the War of 1812.

Preston was elected as a Whig to the Twenty-eighth Congress (March 4, 1843 – March 3, 1845). He was not a candidate for renomination in 1844, and resumed the practices of medicine and agriculture. He died in Perryman, Maryland, and is interred in St. George's Churchyard of Spesutie Island, Maryland.

References

1796 births
1868 deaths
American militiamen in the War of 1812
University of Maryland, Baltimore alumni
Physicians from Maryland
American militia officers
Whig Party members of the United States House of Representatives from Maryland
19th-century American politicians
People from Bel Air, Maryland